The Montefuscos is an American sitcom that was cancelled after three episodes were broadcast in 1975. It aired on Thursday nights at 8:00–8:30 pm (ET) on the National Broadcasting Company (NBC), which chose to run a total of eight episodes (a ninth was pre-empted by Game 5 of the 1975 World Series) from September 4 to October 23, 1975 despite its earlier cancellation notice. Created by executive producers Bill Persky and Sam Denoff, the comedy centered on three generations of an Italian-American family that lived in New Canaan, Connecticut and their weekly gatherings for Sunday dinner. It led off a Thursday primetime schedule that also featured new programs Fay, Ellery Queen and Medical Story.

Cast

 Joseph Sirola as Tony "Papa" Montefusco, patriarch of the family.
 Naomi Stevens as Rose "Mama" Montefusco, Tony's wife.
 Ron Carey as Frank Montefusco, the oldest son and a dentist.
 Phoebe Dorin as Theresa Montefusco, Frank's wife.
 John Aprea as Joseph "Joey" Montefusco, the middle son and a Catholic priest.
 Sal Viscuso as Nunzio Montefusco, the youngest son and an actor.
 Linda Dano as Angelina "Angie" Montefusco Cooney, the daughter.
 Bill Cort as Jim Cooney, Angelina's Episcopalian husband.
 Damon Raskin as Anthony Patrick Cooney, Jim and Angelina's son.
 Dominique Pinassi as Gina Montefusco, Frank and Theresa's daughter.
 Jeffrey Palladini as Anthony Carmine Montefusco, Frank and Theresa's son.
 Robby Paris as Jerome Montefusco, Frank and Theresa's son.

Production
The sitcom's original title prior to its debut was Sunday Night Dinner, but it was changed by NBC's vice president of programs Marvin Antonowsky as a result of unfavorable test results. Thirteen episodes were videotaped before a live audience, but only eight aired.

Reception
The series generally received unfavorable reviews from television critics, some of whom called it "The Monte-Fiascos." John J. O'Connor of The New York Times pointed out the primary target of the criticism when he stated, "We are obviously, snugly ensconced in the world of stereotype." He described the members of the fictional family as tending "to shout frequently, throw their arms about one another, slap one another's back."

Gary Deeb of the Chicago Tribune was much less tactful in his analysis, saying that it was "a program built around an alleged Italian family in which each member talked with his hands, drank gallons of red wine, and said 'AY!' approximately every 15 seconds." He added, "If you grew up in a real Italian family, this shameful piece of burlesque will have you writhing in disbelief."

Cancellation
The Montefuscos was slated to air opposite the first half-hour of The Waltons on CBS and Barney Miller on ABC. It debuted along with Fay and Medical Story on September 4, 1975, just prior to premiere week. Three weeks later on September 25, NBC announced that The Montefuscos and Fay would be dropped from its primetime schedule after October 23 because of poor showings in the Nielsen ratings. Both shows were the first ones cancelled during the 1975–76 television season.

ABC Television president Fred Pierce spoke out against NBC's swift cancellations, pointing out that the ratings for Barney Miller in its first season were no better than those of The Montefuscos under the similar circumstance of going opposite The Waltons in the same time slot. He explained, "Unless a show is absolutely hopeless, a network ought at least try it in another time period before giving up on it, if only out of respect for the people in Hollywood who made large investments of money and time in the programs."

Episodes

References

External links
 
 1975 NBC "Fall Line-Up" Promo Special – Internet Archive.
 The Montefuscos (photo gallery) – Sitcoms Online.

1970s American sitcoms
1975 American television series debuts
1975 American television series endings
English-language television shows
Television series about families
NBC original programming
Television shows set in Connecticut
Television series by MGM Television